Sardar Zahoor Ahmad is a Pakistani politician who was a member of the Provincial Assembly of Khyber Pakhtunkhwa, from May 2013 to May 2018.

Early life and education
He was born in Jangalan village of UC Peeran in Mansehra District. He has a Bachelors of Arts degree.

Political career

He ran for the seat of the Provincial Assembly of the North-West Frontier Province as an independent candidate for Constituency PF-53 (Mansehra-I) in 2002 Pakistani general election but was unsuccessful. He received 5,383 votes and lost the seat to Muhammad Shujah Khan, an independent candidate.

He ran for the seat of the Provincial Assembly of the North-West Frontier Province as a candidate of Pakistan Peoples Party for Constituency PF-53 (Mansehra-I) in 2008 Pakistani general election but was unsuccessful. He received 12,278 votes and lost the seat to Muhammad Shujah Khan, an independent candidate.

He was elected to the Provincial Assembly of Khyber Pakhtunkhwa as an independent candidate for Constituency PK-53 (Mansehra-I) in 2013 Pakistani general election. He received 21,991 votes and defeated Muhammad Shujah Khan, a candidate of Pakistan Peoples Party.
In 2018 elections he has lost seat to Babar Salim Khan of Pakistan tehreek insaf with short margin.

References

Living people
Khyber Pakhtunkhwa MPAs 2013–2018
Pakistan Muslim League (N) politicians
Year of birth missing (living people)